Domenico Scala can mean:

 Domenico Scala (manager), chairman of the FIFA audit and compliance committee
 Domenico Scala (cinematographer), Italian cinematographer